Pascual Duarte is a 1976 Spanish drama film directed by Ricardo Franco. It was entered into the 1976 Cannes Film Festival, where José Luis Gómez won the award for Best Actor. It is based on the novel The Family of Pascual Duarte by author Camilo José Cela.

Cast
 José Luis Gómez as Pascual Duarte
 Diana Perez de Guzman
 Paca Ojea as Pascual's mother
 Héctor Alterio as Esteban Duarte Diniz
 Eduardo Calvo as Don Jesús
 Joaquín Hinojosa as Paco López, "El Estirao"
 Maribel Ferrero
 Eduardo Bea
 Francisco Casares
 Eugenio Navarro
 Carlos Oller
 José Luis Baringo
 Carmen León (as Carmen de León)
 Pedrín Fernández
 Salvador Muñoz Calvo as Pascual Duarte, as a boy

References

External links

1976 films
Spanish drama films
1970s Spanish-language films
1976 drama films
Films directed by Ricardo Franco
Camilo José Cela
1970s Spanish films